USS Cottle (APA-147) was a Haskell-class attack transport in service with the United States Navy from 1944 to 1946. She was scrapped in 1973.

History 
Cottle (APA-147) was launched 25 November 1944 by Kaiser Shipbuilding, Co., Inc., Vancouver, Washington, under a Maritime Commission contract; sponsored by Mrs. B. Decker; transferred to the Navy 14 December 1944; and commissioned the same day.
 
Sailing from Seattle, Washington, 1 March 1945 with U.S. Army troops on board, Cottle carried her passengers to Honolulu where she embarked men of naval construction battalions for transportation to Samar, Philippine Islands, arriving 17 April. Returning by way of Ulithi and Guam to load passengers, cargo, and Japanese prisoners of war, she arrived at Pearl Harbor 24 May to embark four underwater demolition teams for San Francisco, California, arriving 3 June. From 15 June to 7 August she voyaged to Manila with Army troops.

With the end of the war Cottle sailed from San Pedro, California, 24 August, loaded Army occupation troops at Pearl Harbor, and landed them at Wakayama, Japan, 27 September. She embarked homeward bound servicemen in the Philippines, returning with them to San Francisco 30 October, and following another "Operation Magic Carpet" voyage to the Philippines, sailed from San Francisco 12 January 1946 for Norfolk, Virginia, arriving 4 February.

Decommissioning and fate 
Cottle was decommissioned 6 March 1946 and returned to the Maritime Commission 11 March 1946. She was scrapped in 1973.

References

External links 

 NavSource Online: Amphibious Photo Archive - APA-147 Cottle

Haskell-class attack transports
World War II amphibious warfare vessels of the United States
USS Cottle (APA-147)
Ships built in Vancouver, Washington
1944 ships